This article lists airborne command and control squadrons of the United States Air Force.

Airborne command and control squadrons

See also
List of United States Air Force squadrons

Airborne command and control